Extreme Engineering is a documentary television series that aired on the Discovery Channel and the Science Channel. The program featured futuristic and ongoing engineering projects. After ending of season 3 it airs under the Build It Bigger name. The series last season aired in July 2011. Danny Forster first hosted the series in season 4 and has been the host since season 6.

Origins of the show 
Engineering the Impossible was a 2-hour special, created and written by Alan Lindgren and produced by Powderhouse Productions for the Discovery Channel. It focused on three incredible, yet physically possible, engineering projects: the  Gibraltar Bridge, the 170-story Millennium Tower and the over  Freedom Ship. This program won the Beijing International Science Film Festival Silver Award, and earned Discovery's second-highest weeknight rating for 2002. After the success of this program, Discovery commissioned Powderhouse to produce the first season of the 10-part series, Extreme Engineering, whose episodes were written by Alan Lindgren, Ed Fields and several other Powderhouse writer-producers. Like Engineering the Impossible, the first season of Extreme Engineering focused on extreme projects of the future. Season 2 (and all seasons since) featured projects already in construction around the world.

Episodes

Series overview

Pilot 

Season one         episode 4, Icarus' Dream. Master's of Engineering. Amazon Prime Television.

Season 1: 2003

Season 2: 2004 
Season 2  was the first season produced in HDTV for HD Theater.

Season 3: 2005–06

Season 4: 2006 
Powderhouse Productions produced six episodes for season 4 with host Danny Forster. After ending of season 3 it airs under the Build It Bigger name on HD Theater, The Science Channel, and Discovery Channel.

Season 5: 2006

Season 6: 2007

Season 7: 2009

Season 8: 2010

Season 9: 2011

See also 
 Mega Builders
 Megastructures, a similar show on the National Geographic Channel
 Impossible Engineering

References

External links 
 Powderhouse Productions homepage
 WAGtv homepage
 Extreme Engineering official website at Discovery Channel
 Extreme Engineering episode guide at Discovery Channel
 Build It Bigger official website at Science Channel
 
 

 "Woodrow Wilson Bridge Featured On Discovery Channel Tonight" (Washington Post article)
 Symposium W.S.V Simon Stevin, student association of the Mechanical Engineering faculty of the Eindhoven University of Technology

2003 American television series debuts
2011 American television series endings
2000s American documentary television series
2010s American documentary television series
Documentary television series about industry
Engineering projects
Discovery Channel original programming